La Serena is a  comarca located in the east of province of Badajoz, Extremadura, Spain. The main town is Castuera.

It is a comarca based on a natural region which includes plains, as well as some low ranges of the Sierra Morena. The climate is continental, with strong fluctuations.

It grows fine grass grazed by merino sheep that produce a renowned wool and whose milk yields a well known cheese denominated La Serena cheese, which is a protected product by its origin.

The population of the territory is around 39,000 inhabitants.

Municipalities 
The comarca contains the following municipalities:

 Benquerencia de la Serena
 Campanario
 Capilla
 Castuera
 Cabeza del Buey
 Esparragosa de la Serena
 Higuera de la Serena
 La Coronada
 La Haba
 Magacela
 Malpartida de la Serena
 Monterrubio de la Serena
 Orellana la Vieja
 Peñalsordo
 Quintana de la Serena
 Valle de la Serena
 Villanueva de la Serena
 Zalamea de la Serena
 Zarza-Capilla

External links 
 La Serena (Facebook)
 Oveja Merina
 Queso de Oveja Merina de La Serena
 Denominación de Origen Aceite Monterrubio

References

Comarcas of Extremadura
Province of Badajoz